In molecular biology, the VHS protein domain is approximately 140 residues long. Its name is an acronym derived from its occurrence in VPS-27, Hrs and STAM. It is a domain commonly found in the N-terminus of many proteins.

Function
VHS domains are thought to be very important in vesicular trafficking,  in particular, aiding membrane targeting and cargo recognition role.

Structure
Resolution of the crystal structure of the VHS domain of Drosophila Hrs and human TOM1 revealed that it consists of eight helices arranged in a double-layer superhelix. The existence of conserved patches of residues on the domain surface suggests that VHS domains may be involved in protein-protein recognition and docking. Overall, sequence similarity is low (approx 25%) amongst domain family members.

Classification
Based on regions surrounding the domain, VHS-proteins can be divided into 4 groups:

STAM/EAST/STAM2(Hbp) which all share the domain composition VHS-SH3-ITAM and carry one or two ubiquitin-interacting motifs
Proteins with a FYVE domain (INTERPRO) C-terminal to VHS which also carry one or two ubiquitin-interacting motifs
GGA proteins with a domain composition VHS-GAT (GGA and Tom1) homology domain
VHS domain alone or in combination with domains other than those listed above 

The VHS domain is always found at the N-terminus of proteins suggesting that such topology is important for function. The domain is considered to have a general membrane targeting/cargo recognition role in vesicular trafficking.

References

Protein families
Protein domains